Catherine Grace Dent (born April 14, 1965) is an American actress. She is best known for the role of Danielle "Danny" Sofer in the FX series The Shield, Janet Anderson in Outcast (2016–2018), and General Hale in Agents of S.H.I.E.L.D. (2017–2018).

Early life
Dent was born in Baton Rouge, Louisiana, the daughter of Eleanor Brown and Fred C. Dent, a politician. She attended St. Joseph's Academy high school and graduated in 1993 from the North Carolina School of the Arts.

Career 
Dent began starring in film and television in the early 1990s. Her first feature film was the movie Nobody's Fool (1994). On television she played Janice Talbert in One Life to Live, and made guest appearances on such shows as The Pretender, The X-Files, The Lone Gunmen, The Invisible Man, Law & Order: Special Victims Unit, The Sopranos, Frasier, Judging Amy, CSI: Crime Scene Investigation, Without a Trace, Grey's Anatomy, NCIS, The Mentalist.

Her breakthrough role came in 2002, as L.A.P.D. Officer Danielle "Danni" Sofer on FX's hit drama The Shield. On film, she appeared in Replicant (2001), The Majestic (2001), and 21 Grams (2003).  In 2002 she starred in Taken as Sally Clarke, the emmy-winning miniseries first aired on the Sci-Fi Channel.

Between 2005 and 2014 Dent appeared in several movies including: The Unseen, The Bad Son, Natalee Holloway, Duress, Finding Neighbors and Guilty at 17.

From 2017-2018, Dent guest starred as General Hale in Agents of S.H.I.E.L.D. In February 2020, it was announced that Dent would play Jessica Wolcott in NBC's new show La Brea. In 2021, she was guest on Lucifer playing Dr. Alice Porter.

Personal life
Dent married attorney Peter Eliasberg on March 23, 2002. They have one child.

Filmography

References

External links
 

1965 births
20th-century American actresses
21st-century American actresses
Actresses from Baton Rouge, Louisiana
American film actresses
American television actresses
Living people
University of North Carolina School of the Arts alumni